Percy Herbert (31 July 1920 – 6 December 1992) was an English actor. He worked predominantly from the 1950s into the 1970s and became one of the most recognisable faces in post-war British cinema.

Biography
He served in the Royal Army Ordnance Corps during the Second World War and spent four years in the Japanese prisoner of war camp Changi. After the war, he was helped by Dame Sybil Thorndike
to secure an interview with the Royal Academy of Dramatic Art where he won a scholarship. His acting career began in the theatre, which included working at John Gielgud's Old Vic Company.

Beginning in 1954, he went on to make nearly seventy films, often playing soldiers, most notably in The Cockleshell Heroes, The Bridge on the River Kwai (for which he also worked as consultant as well as suggesting the use of the well-known "Colonel Bogey March" which the prisoners whistled in the film), Sea of Sand, Tunes of Glory, The Guns of Navarone, Guns at Batasi, Tobruk and The Wild Geese. However, he was equally at home in comedies (Barnacle Bill, Casino Royale, two Carry On films), fantasy (One Million Years B.C., Mysterious Island), drama (Becket, Bunny Lake is Missing), and science fiction (Quatermass 2, Night of the Big Heat).

He also acted on television; he was a regular on the short-lived American series Cimarron Strip, during a brief foray to Hollywood. Other television work includes Danger Man, The Saint, Z-Cars, Dixon of Dock Green and Worzel Gummidge.

Herbert was born in East London, and spent his youth learning to become a boxer at the Repton Boxing club. One of three siblings, he was the middle child. His father left home when he was a young boy and he was brought up by his mother Ann Herbert along with his brother Lawrence and his sister Maisie.
During World War II he joined the British Army as a young man and was sent to Singapore via ship to fight in the Pacific. The British ship miscalculated the timing of its entry into harbour, and sailed into Singapore Harbour in broad daylight. The British were  immediately bombed by Japanese aircraft and Herbert jumped ship and swam to shore with a broken collar bone. He was picked up by British soldiers and taken to the Alexandria Hospital, where Herbert survived what was to be the massacre of doctors and patients of the Alexandria Hospital in Singapore. He was among 11 soldiers who survived and ultimately captured and sent to the notorious Japanese Prison Camp at Changi, where he remained as a POW for the duration of the war. He  was assigned to work on the Burma Railway and was released from Changi at the end of the war by American troops, after which he returned to London.  One of the first films he was cast in was Bridge on the River Kwai which was based on the experiences in Changi prison camp. David Lean, the producer of the classic film, paid Herbert a stipend to be a consultant on the film as he had been a POW there and was also cast in the role of Grogan, one of the first roles in which he was cast during his long and varied acting career.
Herbert died of a heart attack, aged 72, on the 6th of December 1992 in Broadstairs, Kent, which is on the south coast of England. He was survived by his childhood sweetheart and wife Amy and his two daughters Vanessa and Katrina .

Complete filmography

 I Done a Murder (1951, TV film) - The Rev. Christopher Spoke
 The Young Lovers (1954) - Richards (uncredited)
 Montserrat (1954, TV film) - Morales
 The Green Carnation (1954) - Casey O'Rourke
 One Good Turn (1955) - "Seen Enough" Boxing Spectator (uncredited)
 The Night My Number Came Up (1955) - R.E.M.E. Sergeant
 The Prisoner (1955) - Soldier (uncredited)
 Confession (1955) - Barman
 The Gold Express (1955)
 Timeslip (1955) - Assassin (uncredited)
 The Cockleshell Heroes (1955) - Marine Lomas
 Doctor at Sea (1955) - Helmsman (uncredited)
 Lost (1956) - Police Constable in Phone Box (uncredited)
 Child in the House (1956) - Det. Sgt. Taylor
 A Hill in Korea (1956) - Pte. Moon
 Tiger in the Smoke (1956) - Copper
 Quatermass 2 (1957) - Gorman
 The Steel Bayonet (1957) - Pte. Clark
 The Bridge on the River Kwai (1957) - Grogan
 Night of the Demon (1957) - Farmer (deleted from US print)
 Barnacle Bill (1957) - Tommy
 The Safecracker (1958) - Sergeant Harper
 No Time to Die (1958) -  1st British soldier
 Sea Fury (1958) - Walker
 Sea of Sand (1958) - 'Blanco' White
 Idol on Parade (1959) - Sgt. Hebrides
 The Hill (1959, TV film) - Reuben
 Serious Charge (1959) - Mr. Thompson
 Deadly Record (1959) - Belcher 
 Yesterday's Enemy (1959) - Wilson
 The Devil's Disciple (1959) - Edict Sergeant
 Don't Panic Chaps! (1959) - Bolter
 A Touch of Larceny (1960) - (uncredited)
 The Challenge (1960) - Shop Steward
 There Was a Crooked Man (1960) - Prison Warden
 Tunes of Glory (1960) - RSM Riddick
 The Guns of Navarone (1961) - Sgt. Grogan
 Mysterious Island (1961) - Sergeant Pencroft
 Mutiny on the Bounty (1962) - Seaman Matthew Quintal
 The Captive City (1962) - Sgt. Maj. Reed
 Call Me Bwana (1963) - First Henchman
 The Cracksman (1963) - Nosher
 Carry On Jack (1963) - Mister Angel, Bo’sun
 Dr. Syn, Alias the Scarecrow (1963) - Dover Castle Jailer
 Becket (1964) - Baron
 Guns at Batasi (1964) - Colour Sgt. Ben Parkin
 The Counterfeit Constable (1964) - L'agent Baxter
 Carry On Cleo (1964) - Guard (uncredited)
 Joey Boy (1965) - Mad George Long
 Bunny Lake Is Missing (1965) - Policeman at Station
 Carry On Cowboy (1965) - Charlie, the Bartender
 One Million Years B.C. (1966) - Sakana
 Tobruk (1967) - Dolan
 Mister Ten Per Cent (1967) - Inspector Great
 The Viking Queen (1967) - Catus
 Casino Royale (1967) - 1st Piper
 Night of the Big Heat (1967) - Gerald Foster
 The Royal Hunt of the Sun (1969) - Diego
 One More Time (1970) - Mander
 Too Late the Hero (1970) - Sergeant Johnstone
 The Other Reg Varney (1970, TV film) - Various characters
 Captain Apache (1971) - Moon
 Man in the Wilderness (1971) - Fogarty
 Doomwatch (1972) - Constable Hartwell
 The Fiend (1972) - Commissionaire
 Up the Front (1972) - Cpl. Lovechild
 Black Snake (1973) - Joker Tierney
 The Mackintosh Man (1973) - Taafe
 Craze (1974) - Detective Constable Russet
 One of Our Dinosaurs Is Missing (1975) - Mr. Gibbons
 Metamorphosis Alpha (1976, TV film) - Thargon Commander
 Hardcore (1977) - Hubert 
 Valentino (1977) - Studio Guard
 The Wild Geese (1978) - Keith
 The London Connection (1979) - Ship's Captain
 The Sea Wolves (1980) - Dennison
 Rules of Justice (1981, TV film) - George Lattimore
 The Love Child (1988) - Maurice

References

External links

 

English male film actors
English male television actors
British World War II prisoners of war
Royal Army Ordnance Corps soldiers
World War II prisoners of war held by Japan
1920 births
1992 deaths
British Army personnel of World War II
20th-century English male actors
Alumni of RADA
Military personnel from London